Mark Christensen is the studio owner and Chief Mastering Engineer at Engine Room Audio in New York City. Christensen is currently known for mastering, producing, and mixing music in the genres of rock, pop, R&B, classical, and hip hop.  Christensen has worked on hundreds of albums, seven of which have been nominated for Grammy Awards as of 2022, with two wins. Christensen has also mastered over thirty Billboard chart top ten hits, and has been involved with 50 projects that have been awarded platinum or gold status by the RIAA. He has mastered material by OK GO, The Killers, 98 Degrees, Boyz II Men, Fergie, Toni Braxton, Talib Kweli, Trey Songz, 50 Cent, Ryan Leslie and The Ting Tings, among others. Along with business partner Scott Lee, Mark opened the New York Audio Academy, an audio engineering school hosted at Engine Room Audio to teach and mentor students on how to record, mix, master and produce records that comply with the music industry's highest standards. Along with Scott Lee and Charles Farrar, he is one of the principals of Bond Street Artist Management. He also periodically chairs and moderates audio engineering panels at music industry events.

Career

Early touring and production (1980s–1990s)
Mark B. Christensen was born in Germany, and raised in the United States and England. By the age of sixteen he was touring with his own progressive rock material in the midwest. He began producing music at age nineteen, while also studying audio engineering and mastering techniques. He spent three years living in London in the early 1990s, producing independent albums and touring with bands such as The Waterboys and The Clash.

After returning to New York City Christensen began working at Soundtrack City as a line producer, and in 1995 he began playing with a number of New York bands. While at Soundtrack City, he signed another record deal based on a self-produced demo, and ended up working on tours for bands such as Radiohead, The Wallflowers and The Gin Blossoms. By the late 1990s he had played as a lead vocalist, guitarist, or songwriter for several bands in Colorado, London, and New York. Also in the 1990s he did session work as a singer, guitarist, and songwriter, singing backup on several projects by Kevin Salem of Roadrunner Records and co-writing material with Ivan Neville. Through Soundtrack City he also worked on the soundtracks for several commercials and films, including music videos for artists such as The Rolling Stones, Cyndi Lauper, Duran Duran, LL Cool J, and 3rd Bass.
In 1995 he took a partial hiatus from music.  During this time he opened and operated a restaurant in Manhattan, returning to music once the restaurant was financially stable.

Founding Engine Room Audio (1996–2003)
In 1996 Christensen founded Engine Room Audio (ERA) in lower Manhattan, originally constructing the studio in his loft apartment to master and record local bands. He is studio owner and chief engineer, and in 2000 he designed the cover for an album by Sin Dizzy. In 2001 he engineered several choral albums through Engine Room Audio, and the following year he remastered the bonus tracks for Linda Perhacs' Parallelograms. As of 2002 Engine Room Audio has offered traditional mastering and duplication services, as well as engineering, mastering, recording, and in some cases production. Clients at the studio have since included Lady Gaga, The Killers, and The Ting Tings, Kylie Minogue, A$AP Rocky, and Toni Braxton, among others. Other mastering projects at ERA include an album by Tony Jarvis, a number of classical albums for Museovitch Productions, and several projects for Respect Music, an alternative dance label in Hong Kong.

Founding Engine Room Recordings (2004–08)

The independent record label Engine Room Recordings was started by Christensen and Peter Block in 2005. In 2006 the label released its first record, Twisted Heart by Goat, with Christensen mastering. The New York City-based band Porter Block soon joined the roster, with Christensen again mastering their debut album. Engine Room is also well known for producing the compilation series Guilt by Association. Guilt by Association Vol. 1 (2007), Guilt by Association Vol. 2 (2008) and Guilt by Association Vol. 3 (2011) feature various independent artists covering well-known pop, R&B and rock songs from the 1980s, 1990s, and 2000s, with Christensen mastering. The label released a compilation of Weezer covers in 2012.

In 2008 Engine Room Recordings signed Brooklyn-based bands Lowry and The Bloodsugars. Christensen helped produce as well as master Lowry's debut album. 2009 saw the label sign U.S. Royalty, among other bands. While Christensen worked on many of Engine Room's releases at that time, he also continued to master material for artists on other labels such as Babygrande. He has mastered a large number of singles and albums for Trey Songz on Atlantic Records since 2008, with Christensen explaining that "I master a lot of different styles of music, but his records are especially fun to work on" because of the production values. Also in 2008 Christensen continued to play guitar as a session musician for labels such as Universal Australia. In 2009 he mastered albums such as War Angel and Before I Self Destruct by 50 Cent.

Recent projects (2010–present)

In early 2012 Christensen mastered the first single off Trey Songz' album Chapter V, titled "Heart Attack," which was produced by Benny Blanco and Rico Love. Around that time he mastered a track for Pauly D on G-Note Records as well, and he worked with the Italian rap group Club Dogo in June 2012. Signed to Universal Music Group, the group's members DJ Don Joe and engineer Andrea "db" Debernardi flew to New York to mix and master an album with Christensen. Their resulting single "Cattivi Esempi" reached No. 2 on the Italian music charts. Christensen's other mastering projects in 2012 included the alt-rock band Weep's album Alate and the Trey Songz album Chapter V, which reached No. 1 on the Billboard 200 chart. Also that September, 50 Cent was in the studio with Christensen to master his single "New Day," which features Dr. Dre and Alicia Keys. The song was mixed by Eminem before mastering.

In 2013 Mark started working with the artist "Mr Probz", initially on his album "The Treatment" and the single "Waves" and new material including the single "Nothing Really Matters".  On 27 April 2014, Waves debuted at number one on the UK Singles Chart after selling 127,000 copies in its first week. As of October 2014, it was the fourth-biggest selling single of 2014 in the UK, with sales of 758,000. The song also peaked at number one in Australia  (currently 3× platinum), Austria (currently gold), Germany (currently 5× platinum), Italy (currently 3× platinum), Sweden (currently 5× platinum) and Switzerland (currently platinum).  In the United States, the remix reached number one on the Billboard Dance/Mix Show Airplay chart for the issue dated 16 August 2014 and is currently Platinum.

Engine Room Audio in 2014 continued to work on projects by both 50 Cent and Trey Songz, with Christensen mastering albums such as 50 Cent's Animal Ambition. Other recent mastering projects include Collide by Boyz II Men and Game Changer by Johnny Gill. Christensen's associated projects had been nominated for five Grammy Awards as of 2015, winning two of them. At that point Christensen had also worked on over 24 Billboard chart top ten hits, and around 25 of the releases had gone platinum or gold. Christensen is an official  "mentor" at Recording Connection, a New York-based school for music recording. He also periodically chairs and moderates audio engineering panels at music industry events.

Discography

Production credits

References

External links
Mark Christensen at Engine Room Audio
Mark Christensen on Twitter

Living people
American audio engineers
Year of birth missing (living people)